Margaryan or Markaryan or its Western Armenian variant Markarian is a common Armenian family name.

Margaryan may refer to:

 Andranik Margaryan (1951–2007), Prime Minister of Armenia (2000–2007)
 Aram Margaryan (born 1974), Armenian freestyle wrestler
 Gurgen Margaryan (1978–2004), lieutenant in the Armenian army murdered in Budapest, Hungary
 Hayk Margaryan (born 1985), better known by stage name HT Hayko, Armenian rapper
 Robert Markaryan (born 1949), Russian diplomat
 Smbat Margaryan (born 1993), Armenian weightlifter
 Taron Margaryan (born 1978), mayor of Yerevan, Armenia

See also
Markarian (disambiguation), variant in Western Armenian

Armenian-language surnames